East Killara is a suburb on the Upper North Shore of Sydney in the state of New South Wales, Australia. East Killara is located 15 kilometres north of the Sydney Central Business District in the local government area of Ku-ring-gai Council. It is bordered by Garigal national park to the East and Eastern Arterial Rd/ Birdwood Ave to the west. Killara is a separate suburb to the south-west, which shares the postcode of 2071.

East Killara is set in peaceful bushland. The main road is Koola Avenue which extends from Birdwood Avenue to Albany Crescent.

History

Killara is an Aboriginal word meaning permanent or always there.

East Killara was gazetted as a separate suburb from Killara on 5 August 1994.

Population
At the 2016 census, there were 2,978 residents in East Killara. 42.4% of people were born in Australia. The next most common countries of birth were China 17.3%, Hong Kong 6.6% and England 5.4%,  47.1% of people spoke only English at home. Other languages spoken at home included Cantonese 17.5% and Mandarin 17.3%. The most common responses for religion were No Religion 40.4%, Catholic 16.2% and Anglican 11.9%. East Killara residents had high incomes, with a median weekly household income of $2,524 compared to the national average of $1,438. Almost all occupied private dwellings were separate houses (99.7%). The average household size was 3.3 people.

Commercial area

There is a small shopping centre containing a bakery/supermarket, café, pharmacy, fruit market, liquor store, hairdresser, Chinese restaurant, GP and a real estate agent.

Schools
The suburb contains Killara High School, a public secondary school.

References

Suburbs of Sydney
Ku-ring-gai Council